Joey Hadorn (born 11 April 1997) is a Swiss orienteering competitor, born in Bern.

Career
Hadorn won three gold medals at the 2016 Junior World Orienteering Championships in Engadin, in the long distance, sprint and relay respectively, and a silver medal in the middle distance. At the 2017 Junior World Orienteering Championships, he won a bronze medal in sprint. He became Swiss champion in middle distance in 2018. His achievements at the 2019 Orienteering World Cup include a victory in the middle distance and a second place in knockout sprint in Laufen, Switzerland, and a second place in the middle distance at the world cup final in China.

Results

World Cup victories

References

External links
 
 

1997 births
Living people
Sportspeople from Bern
Swiss orienteers
Male orienteers
Foot orienteers
Junior World Orienteering Championships medalists
Competitors at the 2022 World Games
World Games medalists in orienteering
World Games gold medalists